Gopalpur is a Vidhan Sabha constituency of Ganjam district, Odisha.

This constituency includes Gopalpur, Ward Nos. 25 to 27 of Brahmapur, Rangailunda block and 4 Gram panchayats (Hugulapatta, Gurunthi, Barigan and Nimakhandi) of Kukudakhandi block.

Elected Members

Ten elections were held between 1974 and 2014.
Elected members from the Gopalpur constituency are:
2014: (132): Pradeep Kumar Panigrahy (BJD)
2009: (132): Pradeep Kumar Panigrahy (BJD)
2004: (74): Trinath Behera (Indian National Congress)
2000: (74): Rama Chandra Sethy (BJD)
1995: (74): Rama Chandra Sethy (Janata Dal)
1990: (74): Rama Chandra Sethy (Janata Dal)
1985: (74): Ghansyam Behera (Congress)
1980: (74): Ghansyam Behera (Congress-I)
1977: (74): Ghansyam Behera (Congress) 
1974: (74): Mohan Nayak (Congress)

2019 Election Result

2014 Election Result
In 2014 election, Biju Janata Dal candidate Pradeep Kumar Panigrahy defeated  Bharatiya Janata Party candidate Bibhuti Bhusan Jena by a margin of 20,112 votes.

Summary of results of the 2009 Election
In 2009 election, Biju Janata Dal candidate Pradeep Kumar Panigrahy defeated Indian National Congress candidate Dr. Trinath Behera by a margin of 18,758 votes.

Notes

References

Assembly constituencies of Odisha
Politics of Ganjam district